Stoked for the Holidays is an annual all ages music concert held in Sydney, Nova Scotia. The event takes place the week leading up to Christmas. The first "Stoked" was held in December 1998 and the show has run annually with the exception of December 2006, which was canceled when no suitable venue could be found to hold the event.

History 
Stoked for the Holidays was originally created by a group headed by former local promoter Scott Gillard. Over the years has been organized in association with the Youth Association of Glace Bay, Gillard's LoCL Promotions, and is now a joint venture of Under the Underground/We Unite! founder Joe Costello and former LoCL employee Gillian Hillier.

Recurring themes 
The main characteristics of Stoked for the Holidays are the "12 Bands of Christmas", 12 mainstage acts that are the main attraction of the show, and the annual "Stoked Afterparty", a 19+ event that takes place at a local bar after the show has completed. There is also a varying number of sidestage performances at the event, short sets of mostly solo performers playing at a special designated area.

In previous years, bands accepted to play the concert have been mandated to include one Christmas song into their set. This has led to many memorable cover songs and originals such as Nothing to Say's rendition of 'Feliz Navidad' and I Was a Spy's 'What Child Is This?'. In 2001, ...And Then They Fall wrote their own holiday inspired song that proclaimed "Scott Gillard (then organizer/founder of the event) is the Devil".

Association with cblocals.com 
In association with local website "CBLocals.com", Stoked for the Holidays has been a platform for special merchandise available for the first time at the event. This has included three versions of 'Locals Hoodies', CBLocals mix cds, and even the screening/sale of CBLocals.com creator Harry Doyle's first skate film 'Scenery'.

Past performers 
Some of the more notable performers at the event have been nationally and regionally recognized bands such as Slowcoaster, Rock Ranger, I Was a Spy, One Day Late, Greg MacPherson, The Lighthouse Choir, Drowning Shakespeare, Carmen Townsend and the Shakey Deals, and The Ballroom Massacre.

Recurring events established in 1998
Rock festivals in Canada
Music festivals in Nova Scotia